Hex River may refer to:

 Hex River (Breede River), a tributary of the Breede River in South Africa
 Hex River (Rustenburg), passing through Rustenburg, South Africa
 Hex River (Elands River), a tributary of the Elands River in South Africa

See also 
 Hex River Mountains
 Hex River Pass
 Hex River Poort Pass
 Hex River Tunnels